Xigong District is a district of the city of Luoyang, Henan province, China.

Xigong District is located in the center of Luoyang City, and is the economy, finance and business center of the city.

Administrative divisions
As 2012, this district is divided to 8 subdistricts and 2 townships.
Subdistricts

Townships
Luobei Township
Hongshan Township

References

Districts of Luoyang